Anthony Beavers (born 8 May 1963) is an American philosopher.  he holds the positions of professor of philosophy, director of cognitive science, and director of The Digital Humanities Laboratory at the University of Evansville. Beavers received his MA and BA from Trinity College, Hartford and his PhD from Marquette University. He was the fourth president of the International Association for Computing and Philosophy (IACAP).

Throughout his career, Beavers has been interested in search-engine design. In 1996, he and Hiten Sonpal built the first peer-reviewed search engine, called Argos. Beavers is the creator and editor of the online journal Noesis.

References

External links
https://web.archive.org/web/20120402012528/http://faculty.evansville.edu/tb2/

Philosophers of mind
Philosophers of technology
21st-century American philosophers
Marquette University alumni
Trinity College (Connecticut) alumni
1963 births
Living people
Philosophers from New Hampshire